NEX (stylized as "nex") is a regional shopping mall in Serangoon, within the North-East Region of Singapore. The largest mall in North-East Singapore and one of the largest suburban malls in the country, and is integrated with the air-conditioned Serangoon Bus Interchange and Serangoon MRT station.

History
Built on an empty plot of land right above the Circle line portion of Serangoon MRT station, NEX was developed by its owner, Gold Ridge Pte Ltd and was completed in November 2010. As a regional mall, it had two food courts, Food Junction and Food Republic, a NTUC FairPrice Xtra hypermarket, a Cold Storage supermarket, a Shaw Theatres cinema, an Isetan department store and more than 380 shops back then. The mall pioneered several firsts in Singapore, such as a rooftop dog park integrated with a dry and wet playground and Serangoon Public Library, the first public library to be built on a rooftop. The mall's second basement (lowest floor of the mall) houses the Serangoon Bus Interchange.

In 2014, the mall underwent minor renovations, such as renovating a part of Level 1 to incorporate fashion giants Uniqlo and H&M, and relocating Kiddy Palace to level 4. The mall's tenant mix was also slightly refreshed as well, such as Anytime Fitness opening on the roof level of the mall, and various beauty tenants occupying a part of Ground Floor (Basement 1) and Level 1, such as Innisfree, Sephora and jewelry shops such as Swarovski.

Awards
 2018 - BCA Green Mark

References

External links
 

Shopping malls in Singapore
Commercial buildings completed in 2010
Buildings and structures in Serangoon
Shopping malls established in 2010
Tourist attractions in North-East Region, Singapore